The  was a Japanese military-political coalition established and disestablished over the course of several months in early to mid-1868 during the Boshin War. Its flag was either a white interwoven five-pointed star on a black field, or a black interwoven five-pointed star on a white field.

History
The Alliance centered on the Sendai, Yonezawa, and Nihonmatsu domains, and drew together nearly all domains from the provinces of Mutsu and Dewa, several domains of northern Echigo Province, and even the Matsumae Domain of Ezo (modern-day Hokkaidō).  Headquartered at Shiroishi Castle, the alliance's nominal head was Prince Kitashirakawa Yoshihisa, the onetime abbot of Kan'eiji Temple in Edo who fled north following the Satsuma–Chōshū takeover of the city, who declared himself "Emperor Tobu" (東武天皇), with Date Yoshikuni of Sendai and Uesugi Narinori of Yonezawa as the head of the Alliance. Although heteroclite in nature, the Alliance formed of a combination of modern and traditional forces, and mobilized a total of about 50,000 soldiers. Though the alliance did its best to support the Aizu domain (会津藩), Aizu was not formally part of the alliance "Kaishō Alliance" (会庄同盟); neither was Shōnai (庄内藩).

In addition, though it technically no longer existed as a domain, the forces of the Hayashi clan of Jōzai Domain also fought on behalf of the Alliance.

While the alliance was a bold, innovative step that combined the military forces of several dozen domains, it was unable to fully act as a single, cohesive unit, and with the fall of Sendai and Aizu, it effectively collapsed.

Members of the Ōuetsu Reppan Dōmei

Notes

References

External links
Background on the Ōuetsu Reppan Dōmei
More background information

 
Meiji Restoration
Boshin War
1868 establishments in Japan
1868 disestablishments
19th-century military alliances